Bertrand Tchami (born 14 February 1977) is a Cameroonian former professional footballer who played as a forward.

Personal life
Tchami is from a family of footballers. His three brothers also played professionally: his older brother Alphonse, a former Cameroon international, and his younger brothers Joël and Hervé.

References

External links
 
 

Living people
1977 births
Footballers from Douala
Cameroonian footballers
Association football forwards
Danish Superliga players
Ligue 2 players
Odense Boldklub players
Sportivo Luqueño players
C.S. Visé players
K.A.S. Eupen players
SO Romorantin players
Grenoble Foot 38 players
Stade de Reims players
Pau FC players
K. Rupel Boom F.C. players
RC Épernay Champagne players